Wojciech Stawowski (1625 – 20 Jun 1693) was a Roman Catholic prelate who served as  Auxiliary Bishop of Gniezno (1676–1693).

Biography
Wojciech Stawowski was born in 1525. On 23 Mar 1676, he was appointed during the papacy of Pope Clement X as Auxiliary Bishop of Gniezno and Titular Bishop of Petra in Palaestina. In 1676, he was consecrated bishop by Andrzej Olszowski, Archbishop of Gniezno. He served as Auxiliary Bishop of Gniezno until his death on 20 Jun 1693. While bishop, he was the principal co-consecrator of Piotr Mieszkowski (młodszy), Auxiliary Bishop of Włocławek (1679); and Tomasz Bogoria Skotnicki, Auxiliary Bishop of Chelmno (1686).

References 

17th-century Roman Catholic bishops in the Polish–Lithuanian Commonwealth
Bishops appointed by Pope Clement X
1625 births
1693 deaths